Upper Volta was a colony of French West Africa established in 1919 in the territory occupied by present-day Burkina Faso. It was formed from territories that had been part of the colonies of Upper Senegal and Niger and the Côte d'Ivoire. The colony was dissolved on 5 September 1932, with parts being administered by the Côte d'Ivoire, French Sudan and the Colony of Niger.

After World War II, on 4 September 1947, the colony was revived as a part of the French Union, with its previous boundaries. On 11 December 1958, it was reconstituted as the self-governing Republic of Upper Volta within the French Community, and two years later on 5 August 1960, it attained full independence. On 4 August 1984, the name was changed to Burkina Faso.

The name Upper Volta indicates that the country contains the upper part of the Volta River. The river is divided into three parts, called the Black Volta, White Volta and Red Volta.

History 

 
Until the end of the 19th century, the history of Upper Volta was dominated by the empire-building Mossi/Mossi Kingdoms, who are believed to have come up to their present location from present-day Northern Ghana. For centuries, the Mossi peasant was both farmer and soldier, and the Mossi people were able to defend their religious beliefs and social structure against forcible attempts to convert them to Islam by Muslims from the northwest.

When the French arrived and claimed the area in 1896, Mossi resistance ended with the capture of their capital at Ouagadougou. In 1919, certain provinces from Upper Senegal and Niger were united into a separate colony called the Upper Volta in the French West Africa federation. In 1932, the new colony was dismembered in a move to economise; it was reconstituted in 1937 as an administrative division called the Upper Coast. After World War II, the Mossi renewed their pressure for separate territorial status and on 4 September 1947, Upper Volta became a French West African territory again in its own right.

The indigenous population is highly discriminated against. For example, African children were not allowed to ride bicycles or pick fruit from trees, "privileges" reserved for the children of colonists. Violating these regulations could land parents in jail.

A revision in the organisation of French overseas territories began with the passage of the Basic Law (Loi Cadre) of 23 July 1956. This act was followed by reorganisational measures approved by the French parliament early in 1957 that ensured a large degree of self-government for individual territories. Upper Volta became an autonomous republic in the French community on 11 December 1958.

Upper Volta achieved independence on 5 August 1960. The first president, Maurice Yaméogo, was the leader of the Voltaic Democratic Union (UDV). The 1960 constitution provided for election by universal suffrage of a president and a national assembly for five year terms; however, soon after coming to power, Yaméogo banned all political parties other than the UDV.

Colonial governors

Lieutenant Governors (1919–1932)
Édouard Hesling (9 November 1919 – 7 August 1927)
Robert Arnaud (7 August 1927 – 13 January 1928), acting
Albéric Fournier (13 January 1928 – 22 December 1932)
Gabriel Descemet (22 December 1932 – 31 December 1932)

Governors (1947–1958)
Gaston Mourgues (6 September 1947 – 29 April 1948), acting
Albert Mouragues (29 April 1948 – 23 February 1953)
Salvador Jean Étcheber (23 February 1953 – 3 November 1956)
Yvon Bourges (3 November 1956 – 15 July 1958)
Max Berthet (15 July 1958 – 11 December 1958), acting

High Commissioners (1958–1960)
Max Berthet (11 December 1958 – February 1959)
Paul Masson (February 1959 – 5 August 1960)

People born in French Upper Volta
 Norbert Zongo
 Gilbert Diendéré

See also 
Upper Voltan Territorial Assembly election, 1957
List of French possessions and colonies
French colonial empire
French West Africa
Heads of state of Burkina Faso
Heads of government of Burkina Faso

References

 
French West Africa
20th century in Burkina Faso
Former colonies in Africa
Upper Volta
Upper Volta
States and territories established in 1919
States and territories disestablished in 1932
States and territories established in 1947
States and territories disestablished in 1958
1919 establishments in French West Africa
1958 disestablishments in French West Africa
1919 establishments in the French colonial empire
1958 disestablishments in the French colonial empire
Burkina Faso–France relations